Euura myrtilloides is a species of sawfly belonging to the family Tenthredinidae (common sawflies) and the larvae forms galls on swamp willow (Salix myrtilloides). It was first described by Jens-Peter Kopelke in 1996. E. myrtilloides is one of a number of closely related species which is known as the Euura atra subgroup.

Description
The gall is often low down on the plant and is a conspicuous, elongated swelling on young branches. The larvae over-winter in the gall.

Other similar looking galls in the Euura atra subgroup are,
 E. atra, found on white willow (S. alba) and crack willow (S. fragilis)
 E. auritae, found on eared willow (S. aurita)
 E. salicispurpureae, found on purple willow (S. purpurea)
 E. weiffenbachiella, found on creeping willow (S. repens) and S. rosmarinifolia.

Distribution
Recorded from Finland and Norway.

References

Tenthredinidae
Gall-inducing insects
Hymenoptera of Europe
Insects described in 1996
Taxa named by Jens-Peter Kopelke
Willow galls